Gregorio Jiménez Tornero, known professionally as Goyo Jiménez (born January 31, 1970), is a Spanish actor, screenwriter and humorist known for his stand-up comedy performances.

Life
He spent his childhood in Albacete and studied law at the University of Castilla–La Mancha and theatre at the RESAD.

He started as an actor when he was a teenager in local companies, his own company or theatre companies like La Fura dels Baus, Teatro Capitano or Teatro Fénix.

Filmography

 Clara no es nombre de mujer (2010)
 Torrente 4: Lethal Crisis (Crisis Letal) (2011)
 El pregón (2016)

TV
 El club de la comedia (1999, 2011)
 Nuevos cómicos (2000)
 Esto no es serio (2001)
 La hora chanante (2002)
 UHF (2004)
 59 segundos (2004)
 Splunge (2005)
 Zulú bingo (2005)
 El club de Flo (2006-2007)
 Tres en raya (2006)
 Los irrepetibles (2006-2007)
 9 de cada 10 (2008)
 Espejo público (2008) 
 La hora de José Mota (2009-2010)
 Pánico en el plató (2010)
 Con hache de Eva (2011)
 Psicodriving (2012-2013)
 Se hace saber (2013-2014)
 Zapeando (2014-2015)
 Órbita Laika (2016-2019)
 Samanta y... (2017)
 Código final (2018-2019)

References

External links

www.goyojimenez.es 

1970 births
Living people
People from Albacete
Spanish comedians